Johnny Arcilla (born February 15, 1980) is a Filipino tennis player who represents the Philippines in international competition. Arcilla is a nine-time champion at the Philippine Columbian Association Open Tennis Championship.

Early life
As young as five years old, Johnny Arcilla started as a ball boy in Butuan. His father served as his only coach and would play in the tennis court located just behind his house. At age seven, he began joining tournaments and was scouted by Milo at age ten and saw potential on Arcilla. He later moved to Manila by himself at age twelve, knowing that most tournaments were held in Manila.

Tennis career
Johnny Arcilla first won his first men's single title at the Philippine Columbian Association Open Tennis Championship in 2001. Arcilla later on became the champion of tournament in the 2001, 2006, 2007, 2008, 2009, 2011, 2012, 2013  2019 and 2022 editions at the age of 42.  Arcilla was just 21 when he won his first title in 2001.

References

External links

Filipino male tennis players
People from Butuan
Sportspeople from Agusan del Norte
1980 births
Living people
Tennis players at the 2006 Asian Games
Tennis players at the 2010 Asian Games
Southeast Asian Games gold medalists for the Philippines
Southeast Asian Games competitors for the Philippines
Southeast Asian Games bronze medalists for the Philippines
Southeast Asian Games medalists in tennis
Competitors at the 2005 Southeast Asian Games
Competitors at the 2007 Southeast Asian Games
Competitors at the 2009 Southeast Asian Games
Asian Games competitors for the Philippines
Competitors at the 2001 Southeast Asian Games